The 1946 Nice Grand Prix (officially the V Grand Prix de Nice) was a Grand Prix motor race held at Nice in France on Monday, 22 April 1946. According to some sources this was the first official Formula 1 race.

Entry list

Classification

Pole position: Luigi Villoresi in 1:45.0 (110.331 km/h)
Fastest lap: Raymond Sommer in 1:44.8 (110.542 km/h).

References

Nice